Lee Murphy (born 7 January 1977) is an Australian former professional rugby league footballer who played in the 1990s and 2000s.  Murphy played for the St George Dragons, St George Illawarra Dragons and Wests Tigers.

Early life
Murphy was a student of Marist College Kogarah, and played his junior football there.

Playing career
Murphy made his first grade debut in round 4 1997 against the Gold Coast and scored a try in the 18–12 victory.  Murphy played in the club's final ever game as a stand-alone entity, which was a 20–12 loss against Canterbury in the 1998 finals series.  Murphy then signed on with St. George as they formed a joint venture with Illawarra to form St. George Illawarra and played in the club's first game against Parramatta.

Murphy joined the Wests Tigers in 2001 and retired at the conclusion of that season.

References

External links
 Whiticker, Alan and Hudson, Glen; The Encyclopedia of Rugby League Players; published 2005 by BAS publishing, f16/171 Collins St, Melbourne, Vic., 3000

Australian rugby league players
Wests Tigers players
St. George Dragons players
St. George Illawarra Dragons players
Living people
1977 births
Rugby league fullbacks